Noura's Dream is a 2019 Tunisian drama film directed by Hinde Boujemaa and co-produced by Marie Besson, François d'Artemare, Tatjana Kozar, Imed Marzouk and Samuel Tilman for Propaganda Production. The film stars Hind Sabri in the titular lead role whereas Lotfi Abdelli, Hakim Boumsaoudi and Imen Cherif made supportive roles. It is a love triangle between Noura, Jamal and Lassad which is not lawful according to the Tunisian law which severely punishes adultery.

The film has been shot in Tunis, Tunisia. The film made its premier on 25 June 2020. The film received mixed reviews from critics.

Cast
 Hind Sabri as Noura
 Lotfi Abdelli as Jamel
 Hakim Boumsaoudi as Lassaad
 Imen Cherif as Yoser
 Jamel Sassi as Hamadi - Corrupt Police Officer
 Seifeddine Dhrif as Mahmoud - Police Interrogator 
 Belhassen Harbaoui as Belhassen
 Ikbel Harbaoui as Yosra 
 Meriem Zitouni as Nadia
 Latifa Bida as Âalgia 
 Moncef Ajengui as Mongi
 Achref Ben Youssef as Salah
 Fedi Kahlaoui as Khaled
 Linda Turki as Sarra
 Ons Ben Azouz as Landlord

References

External links 
 

2019 films
2019 drama films
Tunisian drama films